The Death Defying Unicorn is the fifteenth full-length studio album by the Norwegian band Motorpsycho, released on 10 February 2012 via Rune Grammofon and Stickman Records. It was released on double CD and double 12" vinyl. It is a collaboration with Ståle Storløkken, and also features Ola Kvernberg, Trondheimsolistene and the Trondheim Jazz Orchestra.

Track listing

Compact disc
Disc one:
 Out of the Woods (Storløkken) – 2:40
 The Hollow Lands (Sæther) – 7:36
 Through the Veil (parts I & II) (Ryan/Sæther/Storløkken) – 16:01
 Doldrums (Storløkken) – 3:06
 Into the Gyre (Ryan/Sæther) – 10:22
 Flotsam (Storløkken) – 1:33

Disc two:
 Oh, Proteus - A Prayer (Ryan/Sæther/Storløkken) – 7:35
 Sculls in Limbo (Ryan) – 2:21
 La Lethe (Storløkken/Sæther) – 7:53
 Oh, Proteus - A Lament (Ryan/Sæther/Storløkken) – 1:04
 Sharks (Ryan/Sæther/Storløkken) – 7:56
 Mutiny! (Ryan/Sæther) – 8:33
 Into the Mystic (Sæther) – 7:04

Vinyl
Side A:
 Out of the Woods
 The Hollow Lands
 Through the Veil, Part I

Side B:
 Through the Veil, Part II
 Doldrums
 Into the gyre
 Flotsam

Side C:
 Oh, Proteus - A Prayer
 Sculls in Limbo
 La Lethe
 Oh, Proteus - A Lament

Side D:
 Sharks
 Mutiny!
 Into the Mystic

Credits
Music arranged by Motorpsycho and Ståle Storløkken
Words by Bent Sæther
Trondheimsolistene and the Trondheim Jazz Orchestra arranged by Ståle Storløkken

Performed by Motorpsycho:
Kenneth Kapstad – drums
Hans Magnus Ryan – guitars and vocals
Bent Sæther – bass and vocals
and
Ståle Storløkken – keyboards

featuring
Ola Kvernberg – violin
Kåre Chr. Vestrheim – mellotron, various sonic mayhem, gongs and other canned goods of the viennese persuasion

with
Trondheim Jazz Orchestra and Trondheimsolistene

References

2012 albums
Motorpsycho albums